Hiera is a genus of moths.

Hiera may also refer to:
Hiera (mythology), a mythological figure
7119 Hiera, an asteroid
Hiera (Argolis), an island of Argolis, Greece
Hiera (Crete), a town of ancient Crete, Greece
Hiera (Lesbos), a town of ancient Lesbos, Greece
Hiera (Thera), a Greek island in the Aegean Sea